Amangiri is a resort hotel in the Lake Powell region of the U.S. state of Utah. Part of Aman Resorts, it was designed by Marwan Al-Sayed, Rick Joy, and Wendell Burnett, and opened in 2009.

History
The resort opened in 2009 with 34 suites. It became known for its Instagram-friendliness, and as a favored destination for many celebrities.

In 2014, it built 36 private houses, The Mesa at Amangiri, that were sold for between $7.5million and $15million.

In 2020, it expanded again, adding Camp Sarika, 10 tented pavilions that can accommodate 30 guests.

Facilities
The hotel sits on a  parcel of land, which was acquired via a land swap with the U.S. Bureau of Land Management that had to be approved by the U.S. Congress.

The hotel was designed by Marwan Al-Sayed, Rick Joy, and Wendell Burnett. It has a minimalist aesthetic, making heavy use of large concrete slabs. Each room has an open view to the surrounding desert landscape. A sandstone rock escarpment protrudes into the main swimming pool.

The main dining room can accommodate 79 guests and serves Native American–inspired cuisine. There is also a  spa.

Elsewhere on the property, there is via ferrata climbing, horseback riding, and other activities for guests.

Operation
The hotel is owned and operated by the Aman Resorts group. It employed 240 staff members . Staff are instructed to memorize guests' names.

Rooms were sold at around $3,500 per night during peak season .

Reception 
The hotel has received positive critical reception. Reviewers have praised it for having a serene aesthetic, sense of exclusivity, and perceived connection to nature.

Romy Oltusky, writing for Harper's Bazaar, described it as "a surreal combination of extreme luxury and rugged wilderness, nestled in 600 acres of basically untouched Southwestern desert mountains (for people who want the Wild experience but with 1000-thread count)."

References

External links

 

Aman Resorts
Buildings and structures in Utah
Hotels in Utah
Resorts in the United States
Tourist attractions in Utah
2009 establishments in Utah
Modernist architecture in Utah